"Rise..." is the 1985 debut single by English new wave duo Into a Circle, credited here as 'In Two a Circle'.

Track listing
12" (1985, Arcadia, ARC001)
"Rise..."
"And in Flames"
"Gabriel"

Sleeve notes
"Nevermore a piece in our memory. Will to go on, will crucify, will caress... will circle you in two."

References

1985 debut singles
Into a Circle songs
1985 songs